Boháňka is a municipality and village in Jičín District in the Hradec Králové Region of the Czech Republic. It has about 300 inhabitants.

Administrative parts
Villages of Chloumek, Skála and Votuz are administrative parts of Boháňka.

References

Villages in Jičín District